Travis John Klune (born May 20, 1982) is an American author of fantasy and romantic fiction featuring gay and LGBTQ+ characters. His fantasy novel The House in the Cerulean Sea is a New York Times best seller and winner of the 2021 Alex and Mythopoeic Awards. Klune has spoken about how his asexuality influences his writing. His novel Into This River I Drown won the Lambda Literary Award for Best Gay Romance in 2014.

Personal life 
Klune was born in Roseburg, Oregon. He was eight years old when he first began to write fiction. His young work in poetry and short stories were the first to be published. Klune's writing influences include Stephen King, Wilson Rawls, Patricia Nell Warren, Robert McCammon, and Terry Pratchett.

Klune has been open about his lived experiences with asexuality, queerness and neurodiversity, and how they influence his writing. The historical absence of these communities in fiction has motivated choices in Klune's character development.

In 2013, Klune proposed to author Eric Arvin at the GayRomLit Conference in Atlanta, Georgia. The two had met for the first time in person one year earlier at the 2012 GayRomLit Conference in Albuquerque, New Mexico. Arvin endured many years of health struggles and passed away on December 12, 2016.

Career 
Klune's love of writing began as a child in the 1980s, where he would write fan fiction about his favorite action-adventure video game Metroid. Later in his childhood, he began writing original stories. His teachers would always encourage his work, saying they look forward to seeing his writing in bookstores one day.

Klune's first book, Bear, Otter and the Kid, was published in 2011. Due to the prevalence of pen names in M/M romantic fiction, he wrote under the pseudonym TJ Klune. His motivation for this first book came from a realization of the poor, often offensive stereotypes of queer characters within stories. He wanted to be able to write a novel that had an accurate representation of queer relationships, that were not stereotypical, instead were seen as relatable and positive. Amazon noted Bear, Otter and the Kid as one of the top LGBTQ+ books of 2011.

In 2013, he wrote a magical realist novel, Into This River I Drown, while processing the death of his father. A supernatural tale about grief and love in a small town, it won the 2014 Lambda Literary Award for Best Gay Romance. Other novels written by Klune include the queer werewolf series Green Creek, the queer superhero series The Extraordinaries, the contemporary romance How to be a Normal Person and the comedic fantasy series Tales from Verania.

The House in the Cerulean Sea, Klune's first stand-alone novel published with the Macmillan Tor imprint, was partially inspired by the Sixties Scoop, where the Canadian government removed Indigenous children from their homes and placed them with unrelated white, middle-class families. Seeing the similarities of this event take place in the current-day Southern United States, Klune felt a need to write a story celebrating children's differences and to show the positive effects of giving children a safe and supportive place to be themselves. The book is about a man named Linus Baker who travels to Marsyas Island as a representative of the Department in Charge of Magical Youth. The island is home to six magical kids, including Lucifer aka "Lucy" - the son of the devil.

Klune is signed with the Macmillan Tor imprint, Tor Teen, for two more stand-alone Young Adult novels and the completion of his Extraordinaries trilogy.

Awards and critical reception 

{| class="wikitable"
! Year
! style="min-width: 15em" | Work
! style="min-width: 12em" | Award
! style="min-width: 7em" | Category
! style="min-width: 6em" | Result
! 
|-
! style="font-weight: normal" | 2013
| Into This River I Drown
| Lambda Literary Award
| Gay Romance
| 
| style="text-align: center" |  
|-
! rowspan=2 style="font-weight: normal" | 2020
| rowspan=2 | The House in the Cerulean Sea| Alex Award
| Novel
| 
| style="text-align: center" | 
|-
| Mythopoeic Fantasy Award
| Adult Literature
| 
| style="text-align: center" | 
|-
! style="font-weight: normal" | 2021
| Under the Whispering Door| Locus Award
| Fantasy Novel
| 
| style="text-align: center" | 
|}

Klune's Young Adult debut, The Extraordinaries, is praised by Kirkus for its use of superhero and fan fiction tropes, while Publishers Weekly compliments Klune on writing a teenaged character with ADHD in a positive and supportive light.

His stand-alone fantasy novel, The House in the Cerulean Sea, is a New York Times Best Seller and has been named by The Washington Post as one of “2020’s Best Feel-Good Reads”. Publishers Weekly calls it a “thought-provoking Orwellian fantasy” in its starred review. Kirkus'' praises Klune for his art of creating enduring characters. It was named one of Amazon's Best science fiction and fantasy books of 2020.

Klune was nominated as an all-time favourite M/M author on the book review website Goodreads in 2017. He is also an advocate for better LGBTQ2+ representation in novel, wishing to see more asexual characters like himself reflected in books.

Publications

Explanatory notes

References

External links 
 
 
 

21st-century American novelists
American fantasy writers
Living people
American LGBT novelists
Asexual men
1982 births